The 2017 Copa CONMEBOL Sudamericana was the 16th edition of the CONMEBOL Sudamericana (also referred to as the Copa Sudamericana, or ), South America's secondary club football tournament organized by CONMEBOL.

Argentinian club Independiente defeated Brazilian club Flamengo in the finals by an aggregate score of 3–2 to win their second tournament title. As champions, Independiente earned the right to play against the winners of the 2017 Copa Libertadores in the 2018 Recopa Sudamericana, and the winners of the 2017 J.League Cup in the 2018 Suruga Bank Championship. They also automatically qualified for the 2018 Copa Libertadores group stage.

Chapecoense were the defending champions, but were eliminated by Flamengo in the round of 16. They qualified for the tournament after finishing third in their 2017 Copa Libertadores group.

Format changes
Starting from this season, the following format changes were implemented:
The tournament was expanded from 47 to 54 teams.
A total of 44 teams directly entered the Copa Sudamericana, while a total of 10 teams eliminated from the Copa Libertadores (two best teams eliminated in the third stage of qualifying and eight third-placed teams in the group stage) were transferred to the Copa Sudamericana.
The schedule of the tournament was extended to year-round so it would start in March and conclude in early December.
As the Copa Libertadores and the Copa Sudamericana would be held concurrently, no team would be able to qualify for both tournaments in the same year (except those which were transferred from the Copa Libertadores to the Copa Sudamericana).
The Copa Sudamericana champions would no longer directly qualify for the next edition as they would now directly qualify for the group stage of the Copa Libertadores (although they would still be able to defend their title if they finished third in the group stage).
Brazil would be allocated six berths, decreased from eight.
All teams directly entering the Copa Sudamericana would enter the first stage (previously teams from Argentina and Brazil entered the second stage).

Although CONMEBOL proposed to change the format of the final to be played as a single match at a venue to be chosen in advance, they later decided to keep the two-legged home-and-away format.

Teams
The following 44 teams from the 10 CONMEBOL associations qualified for the tournament, entering the first stage:
Argentina and Brazil: 6 berths each
All other associations: 4 berths each

A further 10 teams eliminated from the 2017 Copa Libertadores were transferred to the Copa Sudamericana, entering the second stage.

Schedule
The schedule of the competition was as follows.

Draws

First stage

Second stage

Final stages

Seeding

Bracket

Round of 16

Quarterfinals

Semifinals

Finals

Statistics

Top goalscorers

Top assists

See also
2017 Copa Libertadores
2018 Recopa Sudamericana
2018 Suruga Bank Championship

References

External links

CONMEBOL Sudamericana 2017, CONMEBOL.com 

 
2017
2